Andrea Marko (born 3 November 1956) is an Albanian retired footballer and football manager.

Playing career

Club
Marko played his entire career for hometown club Dinamo Tirana.

International
He made his debut for Albania in a September 1980 FIFA World Cup qualification match against Finland in Tirana and earned a total of 5 caps, scoring no goals. His final international was a May 1985 FIFA World Cup qualification match against Poland.

Managerial career
In April 2012, he was named manager of Kastrioti Krujë

Personal life
His family was one of the rich families from Dhërmi and his grandfather was killed by the communists in 1944. In 1986 Marko was arrested for alleged gambling and perhaps as being member of that family. He also is the cousin of former Albania international goalkeeper Foto Strakosha.

Honours
Albanian Superliga: 2
 1977, 1980

Albanian Cup: 2
 1978, 1982

References

External links

1956 births
Living people
Footballers from Tirana
Albanian footballers
Association football forwards
Albania international footballers
FK Dinamo Tirana players
Albanian football managers
Luftëtari Gjirokastër managers
KF Bylis Ballsh managers
FK Dinamo Tirana managers
KF Apolonia Fier managers
KF Skënderbeu Korçë managers
KS Kastrioti managers
Kategoria Superiore managers